Sangma is an Indian surname found among people of Meghalaya, India. People with this surname include:

 P. A. Sangma: Indian politician, former Speaker of Lok Sabha and Chief Minister of Meghalaya (February 6, 1988 – March 25, 1990)
 Admiral K. Sangma: Indian politician, Assembly
 Agatha Sangma: Indian politician, daughter of P. A. Sangma and Member of parliament
 Conrad Sangma: Indian politician, son of P. A. Sangma and incumbent current chief minister of Meghalaya
 James Sangma: Indian politician, Assembly
 Mukul Sangma: Indian politician, former Chief Minister of Meghalaya